Waldron Arts Center, also known as the Old City Hall and Fire Station, is a historic city hall located at Bloomington, Indiana. It was built in 1915, and is a three-story, rectangular, Beaux-Arts style limestone building.  Additions were made in 1950 and 1972. It features a modest entrance portico.

It was listed on the National Register of Historic Places in 1989. It is located in the Courthouse Square Historic District.

References

City and town halls on the National Register of Historic Places in Indiana
Government buildings completed in 1915
Beaux-Arts architecture in Indiana
Buildings and structures in Bloomington, Indiana
National Register of Historic Places in Monroe County, Indiana
Historic district contributing properties in Indiana